Senator Hood may refer to:

George Hood (Massachusetts politician) (1806–1859), Massachusetts State Senate
Morris Hood III (born 1965), Michigan State Senate
Thomas Hood (American politician) (1816–1883), Wisconsin State Senate